Justin Miles Phinisee (born April 10, 1983) is a former American football cornerback and punt returner. He was drafted by the Tampa Bay Buccaneers in the seventh round of the 2006 NFL Draft. He played college football at Oregon.

Phinisee was also a member of the Kansas City Chiefs, New England Patriots, St. Louis Rams, Dallas Cowboys and Winnipeg Blue Bombers.

External links
Just Sports Stats
Kansas City Chiefs bio
Oregon Ducks bio
St. Louis Rams bio

1983 births
Living people
Players of American football from Long Beach, California
Players of Canadian football from Long Beach, California
American football cornerbacks
American football safeties
American football return specialists
Oregon Ducks football players
Tampa Bay Buccaneers players
Kansas City Chiefs players
New England Patriots players
St. Louis Rams players
Dallas Cowboys players
Wichita Wild players